is a Japanese professional soft-tip and steel-tip darts player who plays in Professional Darts Corporation (PDC) and other national events. He has competed twice during the PDC World Darts Championship and represented his country at the PDC World Cup of Darts.

Career
Suzuki plays in the soft-tip tournaments since 2012. In 2017, he was able to win a few tournaments at the Perfect Japan Tour and made it onto the podium overall. However, the PDC Asia Tour has not been very successful for him. Suzuki had by far the greatest success in November 2020 when he won the PDC Asia Qualifier held in Japan. In the final match he beat Kota Suzuki by 5–3 in legs. The victory guaranteed him a debut in the 2021 PDC World Darts Championship. In the first round match he lost to Madars Razma by 0–3 in sets.

In June 2022, together with Tomoya Goto, Suzuki represented Japan for the first time at the 2022 PDC World Cup of Darts, but they lost 5–2 to Belgium (Dimitri Van den Bergh and Kim Huybrechts). At the end of September, Suzuki was able to qualify for the 2023 PDC World Darts Championship via advance to the semi-finals of the 2022 PDC Asian Championship.

World Championship results

PDC
 2021: First round (lost to Madars Razma 0–3)
 2023: First round (lost to Boris Krčmar 0–3)

Performance timeline

References

Living people
1987 births
Japanese darts players
PDC World Cup of Darts Japanese team